Miami Coral Park Senior High School is a secondary school located in the Westchester census-designated place of Miami-Dade County, Florida, United States. It is a part of Miami-Dade County Public Schools.

History
The school was opened in 1963. It was the first school with air conditioning in South Florida.

Demographics
Miami Coral Park High School is 93% Hispanic, 2% Black non-Hispanic, 4% White non-Hispanic and 1% unknown, as of 2011.

Notable alumni

Jessica Aguirre (born Jessica Collazo),  TV news anchor
Rafael Anchia, member of Texas House of Representatives District 103
Steven Bauer (born Rocky Echevarria), actor
José Canseco, former professional baseball player
Ozzie Canseco, former MLB player
Alex Castellanos, MLB player 
Janet Dacal, Broadway actress and singer, known for her role as Carla in In the Heights
Orestes Destrade, former professional baseball player
Lili Estefan, TV talk show host
Steve Foucault, former MLB pitcher 
Pedro Gomez, TV sports reporter
Pete Gonzalez, NFL quarterback
Luis Martinez, MLB player 
Alex Marvez, Former President, Pro Football Writers of America
Luis Montanez, class of 2000; MLB player
Elsa Murano (born Elsa Casales), 23rd President of Texas A&M University and former Undersecretary for Food Safety at US Dept. of Agriculture
Danny Pino, actor
Pitbull (born Armando Christian Perez), rap musician
Danny Ramirez, actor
Steven Reinemund, former Chairman of the Board and CEO of PepsiCo
 Sean Rodriguez, Major League Baseball player for the Philadelphia Phillies organization
Tessie Santiago, actress
Barry Smith, former NFL wide receiver
Eric Soderholm, former MLB infielder 
Nelson Vargas, former MLS and USMNT forward
Mel Gorham (born Marilyn Schnier), actress
Zach Neto, 2022 Los Angeles Angels draft pick

See also

Miami-Dade County Public Schools
Education in the United States

References

External links
Miami Coral Park High School
Miami Coral Park High School (archive)

Educational institutions established in 1963
Miami-Dade County Public Schools high schools
1963 establishments in Florida
Westchester, Florida